Peperomia yapasana is a species of plant from the genus Peperomia. It was discovered by William Trelease in Peru, 1929.

References

yapasana
Flora of South America
Flora of Peru
Plants described in 1929
Taxa named by William Trelease